Osgodby is a village and civil parish in the West Lindsey district of Lincolnshire, England. The population of the civil parish, including Kingerby, Kirkby and Usselby, and West Rasen in its own civil parish, was 660 at the 2011 census.

The parish contains the small villages of Kingerby, Kirkby cum Osgodby, Osgodby itself, Usselby and the hamlet of Bishopbridge. To the north is North Owersby. Nearby to the west is the north–south River Ancholme. The population of the parish is 646.

History
At the time of Domesday Book the village consisted of 41 households.

There are medieval settlement remains, including a moat, visible as earthworks and thought to be part of Tournay Manor which was established during the 14th century. In 1424 John Tournay was given as a gift land on the south side of Osgodby, but the principal residence of the family was at Caenby. During the Second World War there was an army camp at Osgodby, and 60 accommodation huts were dispersed within nearby woodland. One building remains at the junction of the A46 - A1103, function unknown, and where the woods border the A1103, Westwards from the A46, many of the foundations are still visible.

Bishopbridge

Bishopbridge is a hamlet at the western limit of the parish of Osgodby, on the A631 and is named after the bridge that crosses the River Ancholme at this point. The hamlet consists of a public house and a few farms and houses.

The settlement marks the upper limit of the navigation of the Ancholme, which was created by an Act of Parliament in 1767, which records the location as Bishop Brigys, in a later Act of 1802 it has changed to Bishop Briggs.

The navigation ends where there is a measurement weir at the gauging station that records the flow of the river. On the adjacent River Rase, another weir and gauging station measures the flow of that river. Both sites are listed as Bishopbridge.

References

External links

 Osgodby Parish Council
 Osgodby Primary School
 "Expressions in Osgodby", BBC Lincolnshire
 Statistics for the parish

Villages in Lincolnshire
Civil parishes in Lincolnshire
West Lindsey District